Balatongyörök is a village in Zala County, Hungary. Balatongyörök is located on the north shore of Lake Balaton, not far from Keszthely.

External links
Official website

References 

Populated places in Zala County